Roots & Crowns is the sixth studio album by American indie rock band Califone. It was released on October 10, 2006, on Thrill Jockey.

The LP version of the album contains different artwork. The song "The Orchids" is a cover of the Psychic TV song of the same name.

Reception

Pitchfork placed Roots & Crowns at number 168 on its list of top 200 albums of the 2000s.

Track listing

References

External links
Roots & Crowns at ThrillJockey.com

2006 albums
Califone albums
Thrill Jockey albums